Anchor is an unincorporated community in central Brazoria County, Texas, United States. It is located within the Greater Houston metropolitan area.

History
Anchor has a long and rich history. The Columbia Tap Railroad, which traveled from Houston to East Columbia, was built through this area sometime before 1852. The Houston and Brazos Valley Railroad then crossed this line at a point known as Chenango Junction in 1893. Its third line was built to Sugar Land in 1908. These three railroads caused the community to have four passenger trains traveling through the community each day. The traffic increased after World War I. A depot was built in the 1890s to handle all railroad business from West Columbia and Brazoria. Some trains took people to several events, including the circus in Houston, ship tours in Galveston, and baseball games in Velasco. The Anchor community was then established near the site of the former community of Fruitland, which was located at the intersection of the International and Great Northern Railroad and the Velasco Terminal. Jacob Whistler's family moved here in 1895. There were plots of land sold here, but when that failed, they expanded into Anchor. The Whistler family then built a hotel and a restaurant for locals. A post office was established at Anchor in 1897 and remained in operation until June 15, 1920, with George W. Richey as postmaster. Mail was then routed from Angleton. The community's business directory included two general stores, two sawmills, a cotton gin, a blacksmith shop, a cafe, a frog leg processing plant, two churches, and Western Union Railroad service. Anchor became a trading center for local farmers. Crops sold in the area included cotton, corn, onions, cabbage, and tomatoes. Farmers raised cattle, hogs, and chickens, with the cattle eventually making milk, butter, and meat. A canning factory was used mostly for tomatoes and owned and operated by a man named Burchard. Several floods and storms hit the area once roads became navigable and automobile sales increased. Its population was 50 with two businesses in 1933, but the store closed in the 1940s due to World War II. Texas State Highway 288 bypassed the community when it was built, and an oilfield caused little growth. The town was no longer on the census in 1950. The only building that remained in the community was a two-story residence that used to be the Whistler Hotel in the 1980s.

The community may have been named for a local cattle brand; it may also have been named after Anchor, Illinois, the native home of an early settler.

An episode of The Dick Van Dyke Show, number 146, entitled "Remember the Alimony", was set in Anchor. In the episode, the town was moved to very near the Mexican border and given an army base.

Geography

Education
Anchor once had its own school with Minnie McMillan-Holland as the teacher from 1914 to 1917. Today, the community is served by the Angleton Independent School District. Children in the area attend Rancho Isabella Elementary School, Angleton Junior High School, and Angleton High School in Angleton.

References

Unincorporated communities in Brazoria County, Texas
Unincorporated communities in Texas